is a Japanese writer. After attending the University of Tokyo he went to the United States for further education. He received his B.A. from San Jose State University in 1955 and his MFA from University of Iowa in 1958. His novel Chōnan no shukke (長男の出家) or My Young Son Becomes a Zen Monk won the Akutagawa Prize in 1988.

References 

People from Muroran, Hokkaido
Writers from Hokkaido
San Jose State University alumni
University of Iowa alumni
1930 births
Living people
Akutagawa Prize winners
International Writing Program alumni